Electraglaia contracta is a species of moth of the family Tortricidae. It is found in Guizhou, China.

References

Moths described in 2004
Archipini